Rachel Nicol may refer to:
 Rachel Nicol (physician) (1845–1881), founder of Pi Beta Phi and a physician
 Rachel Nicol (swimmer) (born 1993), Canadian competitive swimmer

See also
Rachel Nichols (disambiguation)
Killing of Rachel Nickell (1968–1992), British murder victim